Elizabeth King (or variants) may refer to:

Lizzie Lloyd King (1847–?), alleged murderer
Betty King (born c. 1951), Australian jurist
Betty E. King, American diplomat
Betty Jackson King (1928–1994), American pianist, singer, choral conductor, and composer
Betsy King (born 1955), golfer
Elizabeth King (artist) (born 1950), American sculptor and writer
Elizabeth O. King (1912–1966), American microbiologist
Elizabeth King, owner of King's Carriage House
Elizabethkingia, a disease causing meningitis

See also
Betsy King Ross (1921–1989), American actress, anthropologist and author
King (surname)